The Ninety-third Minnesota Legislature is the current meeting of the legislative branch of the state of Minnesota, composed of the Minnesota Senate and the Minnesota House of Representatives. It convened in Saint Paul on January 3, 2023.

Major events 

 January 3, 2023: On the first day of the 93rd Minnesota Legislature, new legislators were sworn in in person for the first time since the COVID-19 pandemic.

Major legislation

Enacted 

 January 31, 2023: Prohibiting discrimination based on hair texture (CROWN Act) (Laws 2023, Chapter 3 - H.F. 37 / S.F. 44)

 January 31, 2023: Protect Reproductive Options Act (Laws 2023, chapter 4 - H.F. 1 / S.F. 1 )
 February 3, 2023: Recognizing Juneteenth as a State Holiday Act (Laws 2023, chapter 5 - H.F. 48 / S.F. 44)
 February 7, 2023: Renewable and carbon free electricity standards act (Laws 2023, chapter 7 - H.F. 7 / S.F. 4)
 March 3, 2023: Voting rights restoration for felons on parole act (Laws 2023, chapter 12 - H.F. 28 / S.F. 26)
 March 7, 2023: Driver's Licenses for All Act (Laws 2023, chapter 13 - H.F. 4 / S.F. 27)
 March 17, 2023: Universal Free School Meals Act (Laws 2023, chapter 18 - H.F. 5 / S.F. 123)

Proposed 
Boldface indicates the bill was passed by its house of origin.
 Paid Family and Medical Leave (H.F. 2 / S.F. 2)
 Democracy for the People Act (H.F. 3 / S.F. 3)
 Criminal Background Checks (H.F. 14 / S.F. 1116)
 Red Flag Legislation (H.F. 15 / S.F. 1117)
 Conversion Therapy Ban (H.F. 16 / S.F. 23)
 Abortion regulating statutes repealed (H.F. 91 / S.F. 50)
 Legalizing Adult-Use Cannabis (H.F. 100 / S.F. 73)
 Trans Refuge Bill (H.F. 146 / S.F. 63)
 Reproductive Freedom Defense Act (H.F. 366 / S.F. 165)

Political composition

Senate

House of Representatives

Leadership

Senate 

 President: Bobby Joe Champion (DFL)
 President pro tempore: Ann Rest (DFL)

Majority (DFL) leadership 

 Majority Leader: Kari Dziedzic (DFL)
 Assistant Majority Leaders
 Liz Boldon 
 Nick A. Frentz 
 Mary K. Kunesh 
 Foung Hawj 
 Kelly L. Morrison 
 Erin P. Murphy

Minority (Republican) leadership 

 Minority Leader: Mark T. Johnson (R)
 Assistant Minority Leaders
 Julia E. Coleman 
 Zach Duckworth 
 Justin D. Eichorn 
 Karin Housley 
 John R. Jasinsksi
 Bill Weber

House of Representatives 

 Speaker: Melissa Hortman (DFL)
 Speaker pro tempore: Dan Wolgamott (DFL)

Majority (DFL) leadership 

 Majority Leader: Jamie Long (DFL)
 Majority Whip: Athena Hollins
 Assistant Majority Leaders
 Esther Agbaje
 Kaela Berg
 Luke Frederick
 Sydney Jordan
 Liz Lee
 Brad Tabke

Minority (Republican) leadership 

 Minority Leader: Lisa Demuth (R)
 Deputy Minority Leader: Paul Torkelson
 Minority Whip: Jim Nash
 Assistant Minority Leaders
 Dave Baker
 Elliott Engen
 Spencer Igo
 Bjorn Olson
 Kristin Robbins
 Isaac Schultz
 Peggy Scott
 Nolan West

Members

Senate

House of Representatives

Committees

Senate

House of Representatives

Notes

References 

Minnesota Legislature
2023 U.S. legislative sessions
2024 U.S. legislative sessions